Wojciech Sadley (born 1932-04-03 in Lublin) is a Polish painter and professor at Warsaw University School of Fine Arts.

External links
 Wojciech Sadley, "Osobna" Galery
 Vernissage at  "Zapiecek" Galery
Całun (Shroud)

References

1932 births
20th-century Polish painters
20th-century Polish male artists
21st-century Polish painters
21st-century male artists
Living people
Polish male painters